Chakulia is a gram panchayat with a police station in Goalpokhar II CD block in Islampur subdivision of Uttar Dinajpur district in the Indian state of West Bengal.

Geography

Location

In the map alongside, all places marked on the map are linked in the full screen version.

Chakulia is a gram panchayat under Goalpokhar-II  intermediate panchayat. Census villages under Chakulia gram panchayat are as follows: Chakulia, Kalibari, Gerua, Kahata, Kaliara, Beharia, Ghordhappa, Bhuindhar, Birran, Pataura, Bara Pokharia, Andharia, Kanki, Puar, Pirdauli, Mathura, Dhakania, Gochhra, Majra, Haripur, Pipla, Urpi, Kariat, Baligora, pathatty, and Bara Shikarpur, Bidyananda Pur, ladhi, Kanjia, Pathati.

Website: www.chakulia.webs.com

Police station
Chakulia police station under West Bengal police has jurisdiction over Goalpokhar II CD Block. It is 62 km from the district headquarters and covers an area of 266.04 km2.

Demographics
As per the 2011 Census of India, Chakalia had a total population of 2,424, of which 1,251 (52%) were males and 1,173 (48%) were females. Population below 6 years was 415. The total number of literates in Chakalia was 1,055 (52.51% of the population over 6 years).

Official languages
As per the West Bengal Official Language (Amendment) Act, 2012, which came into force from December 2012, Urdu was given the status of official language in areas, such as subdivisions and blocks, having more than 10% Urdu speaking population. In Uttar Dinajpur district, Goalpokhar I and II blocks, Islampur block and Islampur municipality were identified as fulfilling the norms set In 2014, Calcutta High Court, in an order, included Dalkhola municipality in the list.

NGO efforts
EduIslam, is a non-profit organization and a research initiative empowering humanity, presenting the correct perceptions of Islam, driving out misconceptions against it & dismantling Islamophobia and extremism to echo the voice of persecuted and ignored sections of the society.

EduIslam with its followers of more than 15k in the giant social media network, Facebook and a website (www.eduislam.in) with more than 5k visitors daily is catering authentic informations, facts and opinions on various range of topics.

Education
 Chakulia High School
 Ramkrishnapur P.D.G.M. High School
 Shakuntala High School
 Shirshi I.M Senior Madrasah
 Nizampur High Madrasah
 Chakulia Jr. Girls High School
 Haripur Jr. High School
 Ramkrishnapur Primary Vidyalaya
 Adarsha M.S.K. Bhuidar
 Toryal High School
 Manora High School
 Lahil Nisindra Madarsa Nisindra Madarsa M.S.K.
 Bidhanpally Primary school
 Lahil M.S.K.
 Hatwar S.S.K
 Kanki Jain Vidya Mandir
 Khikhirtola M.S.K.

Computer education
Rajeev Gandhi Computer Saksharta Mission
Rubel Anjum

Healthcare
Chakulia rural hospital at Chkulia (with 30 beds) is the main medical facility in Goalpokhar II CD block.

References

Villages in Uttar Dinajpur district